The current flag of Billings, Montana, United States, is a "Canadian-like" triband of very dark blue and white with the city seal on the central white panel. The seal shows the Billings skyline line-drawn in blue, with a red disc representing the sun. The seal is outlined in blue with the text "Star of the Big Sky Country" in red capitals. It was designed by Fernando Méndez and adopted in June 1986.

History

On February 3, 1986, the Billings city council approved a citywide contest to design a new flag and seal with a $500 prize for each with a deadline set for May 15. The two contests drew 66 total entries and were won by Fernando Méndez, an immigrant from the Philippines who worked part-time as an art director for a local advertising firm. He was paid $1,000 for his work and the flag was adopted by the city government.

In 2004, the North American Vexillological Association conducted an internet survey of 150 city flags across the US. Billings' flag ranked 106th place out of 150 flags. It received 3.35 points on a 0-10 scale, or D+ rating.

References

Flag
Flags of cities in Montana
Canadian pale flags
Flags introduced in 1986
1986 establishments in Montana